Stig Åkerström (born 15 March 1943) is a Swedish former footballer who played as a forward. He made 89 Allsvenskan appearances for Djurgården and scored 10 goals.

References

Living people
1943 births
Association football forwards
Swedish footballers
Djurgårdens IF Fotboll players
Allsvenskan players